The Treaty of Sahagún was signed in Sahagún on 4 June 1170 between Alfonso VIII of Castile and Alfonso II of Aragon. Based on the terms of the accord, Alfonso VIII agreed to give Afonso II three hostages in order to be used as tribute payments owed by Ibn Mardanīš of Valencia and Murcia. The hostages were to enter into the hand and potestas (or power) of Afonso I up until the terms of the agreement were met. Moreover, the hostages were not allowed to depart without permission.

Notes

Sources
Kosto, Adam J. Making Agreements in Medieval Catalonia: Power, Order, and the Written Word, 1000-1200. Cambridge University Press, 2001. 

1170
12th century in law
12th-century treaties
Sahagun
Treaties of the Kingdom of Castile
1170 in Europe
12th century in Aragon
12th century in Castile